Beatrice of Savoy may refer to:
Beatrice of Savoy, Marchioness of Saluzzo ( 1223–1259)
Beatrice of Savoy, Countess of Provence ( 1198–1267)
Beatrice of Savoy, Lady of Villena (1250–1292)
Beatrice of Savoy, Dame of Faucigny ( 1237–1310)